Alcohol-infused whipped cream is a type of whipped cream that is mixed with an alcoholic drink.

By 2005 it had been commercialized. It has been sold under brand names such as Liquor Whipped, which is 28 proof; CREAM, which is 30 proof; Whipped Lightning which is 35.5 proof and is made in various flavors; Get Whipped, Whipsy, which is 27 proof and made with wine; and Canisters of Cream. The commercial preparations are offered in aerosol cans.

The toppings have been criticized for their potential to be "aimed at young drinkers". "If a product looks like something else, it's easy not to be aware that it might contain a lot of alcohol," a public health official observed. In the United States the sale of alcohol-infused whipped cream is regulated as a "distilled spirits specialty product".

References

External links
OC Weekly Review

Dairy products
Alcohol
Desserts